The Bishop–Cannings theorem is a theorem in evolutionary game theory.  It states that  (i) all members of a mixed evolutionarily stable strategy (ESS) have the same payoff (Theorem 2), and (ii) that none of these can also be a pure ESS (from their Theorem 3). The usefulness of the results comes from the fact that they can be used to directly find ESSes algebraically, rather than simulating the game and solving it by iteration.

The logic of (i) also applies to Nash equilibria (all strategies in the support of a mixed strategy receive the same payoff).

The theorem was formulated by Tim Bishop and Chris Cannings at Sheffield University, who published it in 1978.

A review is given by John Maynard Smith in Evolution and the Theory of Games, with proof in the appendix.

Notes

Evolutionary game theory
Biological theorems
Economics theorems